Frank E. Moore (December 18, 1933 – April 1, 2019) was an American politician.

Moore was born on December 19, 1933, in Rochester Mills, Pennsylvania, and attended Marion Center High School. He was a justice of the peace between 1957 and 1961. Moore then served as treasurer of Indiana County from 1966 to 1970. He was a member of the Pennsylvania House of Representatives from District 62 between 1968 and 1970. Moore died on April 1, 2019, aged 85.

References

Republican Party members of the Pennsylvania House of Representatives
2019 deaths
1933 births
County treasurers in the United States
County officials in Pennsylvania
American justices of the peace
20th-century American politicians
20th-century American judges